Berlin 36 is a 2009 German film telling the fate of Jewish track and field athlete Gretel Bergmann in the 1936 Summer Olympics. In the movie she was replaced by the Nazi regime with a fellow athlete which she befriended. The film, based on a true story,  was released in Germany on 10 September 2009.

Reporters at Der Spiegel challenged the historical basis for many of the events in the film,  pointing to arrest records and medical examinations indicating German authorities did not determine Dora Ratjen as being male until 1938.

Plot 
The athlete Gretel Bergmann wins the high jump championships in the United Kingdom. Since the Nazi racial laws prevented her continuing her training in Germany, being a Jew, her father had sent her to England, where she could live more safely and continue her sporting career.

At the Berlin Olympics in 1936, the Americans and the IOC (International Olympic Committee) demand that Jewish athletes are not to be excluded from the event, especially the high jumper Gretel Bergmann of international fame, thus putting the Nazi Olympic Committee in great difficulty. A victory by a Jewish athlete would seriously humiliate the Nazi party. When her family in Germany is threatened, Gretel returns to Germany. She is included in the German Olympic high jump team, seemingly with the same rights as the other athletes in the training camp.

Hans Waldmann, the coach of the team, is enthusiastic about the skills and discipline of Gretel and adopts a policy of impartiality based solely on sportsmanship. However, Waldmann is dismissed by Nazi party officials and replaced as coach by Sigfrid Kulmbach, loyal to the party. Kulmbach attempts, instead, by every means to discourage the young athlete and undermine her self-esteem.

Her roommate and sole competitor in talent is Marie Ketteler. Marie, however, is really a man, by whom the Nazis want to attain the gold medal in high jump. Between Marie and Gretel,  despite numerous threats from outside, a friendship forms.

Despite being the most promising athlete in high jump training, Gretel is suddenly excluded from competition under false pretences, only a few days before the Games. She is replaced by Marie, the second best athlete.

Marie, however, behaves in strange ways: she never takes a bath with her companions, shaves her legs several times a day and has a deep voice. Gretel, therefore, discovers her true identity. Meanwhile, Marie discovers that Gretel was excluded from the race under false pretenses. So Marie decides to deliberately lose the final and decisive leap. The dislodged bar spells the shattering of hope of victory in the German officials, who are dumbstruck. Marie gains only the fourth place. Marie and Gretel, the latter observing the contest as a spectator, exchange a secret happy smile, for their common opposition led to the defeat of the cruel Nazi ambitions and ideals.

Cast 
 Karoline Herfurth as Gretel Bergmann
 Sebastian Urzendowsky as Marie Ketteler
 Axel Prahl as Hans Waldmann
 August Zirner as Edwin Bergmann
 Maria Happel as Paula Bergmann
 Franz Dinda as Rudolph Bergmann
 Leon Seidel as Walter Bergmann
 Thomas Thieme as Hans von Tschammer und Osten
 Johann von Bülow as Karl Ritter von Halt
 Julie Engelbrecht as Elisabeth 'Lilly' Vogt
 Klara Manzel as Thea Walden
 Robert Gallinowski as Sigfrid Kulmbach
 Elena Uhlig as Frau Vogel
 Tausig as Leo Löwenstein
 John Keogh as Avery Brundage

Premiere 
Berlin 36 premiered on 22 August 2009 in the German capital, Berlin. The film received a critics generally positive. The film has been called "interesting" by the German magazine Der Spiegel and placed in the category "play" with the German weekly Die Zeit.

In January 2010, the film was presented in the Palm Springs International Film Festival. On the same date, the film was presented in the Atlanta Jewish Film Festival and the New York Jewish Film Festival, a film festival that engages with Jewish history.

During the presentation of the movie in the Atlanta Jewish Film Festival, the consular officer Lutz Görgens compared the theme of the movie to Jeremy Schaap's book Triumph, which tells the story of the American athlete Jesse Owens, who won the gold medal in the 1936 Olympic Games, despite the strong discrimination he suffered. Görgens said that "the book and the movie teaches us about the bad politics of sport. They remind us of the preciousness of political freedom, the excellence of athletic futility, and the true value of friendship".

In fact, unlike the film, Gretel Bergmann, as a young woman did not know her partner was later determined to be a man, but she learned it only in 1966, reading an article in Time. Bergmann told the magazine Der Spiegel, at the age of 95 years, "I never suspected anything. We all wondered why she never got naked in the shower. Being so shy at seventeen, it seemed absurd, but we thought, well, it is bizarre and weird".

References

External links 
 
 

2009 films
2000s German-language films
Films about anti-fascism
Antisemitism in Germany
Antisemitism in the United States
Athletics films
Running films
Cross-dressing in film
Films about fascists
Films about rebels
Films set in 1934
Films set in 1935
Films set in 1936
Films set in Berlin
Films set in Germany
Films set in London
Films shot in Germany
Films shot in London
German drama films
German independent films
Jewish British history
Films about Jews and Judaism
Jewish Nazi German history
Jews and Judaism in Berlin
Films about Nazi Germany
Films about the 1936 Summer Olympics
Films about Olympic track and field
Olympic Games controversies
Sports films based on actual events
2000s political films
Cultural depictions of German women
Cultural depictions of track and field athletes
Cultural depictions of transgender people
Biographical films about sportspeople
2000s German films